The TMC Costin is a Clubman-style sports car built from 1983 to 1987 in Castlebridge, County Wexford, Republic of Ireland. Fewer than forty were produced.

History
The Thompsons of County Wexford, Ireland were a farming family with six sons. One son, Peter Thompson, embarked on an engineering career, first as a draughtsman at agricultural engineering firm Phillip Pierce and Co. in Wexford and later with the Timoney Research Centre at Navan, where he was in charge of several projects related to the design of armoured personnel carriers. Eventually three of the brothers were at Timoney: Val Thompson was hired as a Financial controller, and Sean Thompson as a Design technician.

In March 1983 Peter, Val, and Sean, along with a fourth brother, Anthony, established a new company to build cars. While some references call it the "Thompson Motorsport Company", most refer to the business as the "Thompson Manufacturing Company" (TMC). Financial support was provided through the Industrial Development Authority, under the terms of the Small Industries Scheme. Some degree of American investment or ownership is also possible.

Peter asked engineer and aerodynamicist Frank Costin to design the company's first automobile. In addition to designing the car itself, Costin was to develop the tooling and jigs needed to build it in exchange for a 10% royalty on each car sold. This design became Costin's Auto Project XXIV. Conceptually, it was intended to be an improvement on the Lotus Seven. It was also a further development of ideas Costin had explored in his earlier Marcos Xylon. It is described as the first road racing car built in Ireland.

While under development, the car was called the Rushabout. The original engine chosen was the  straight-four engine from the Vauxhall Chevette.

The Thompson brothers hand-built the first car in the family barn. They announced plans to open a  factory with a staff of eight to build the car in July 1983.

The renamed TMC Costin was officially launched at the Mondello Park circuit in late 1983, and sales began the following year. The car was available in three states of tune: GTA, GTB, and GTC, and offered in kit form or as a fully assembled automobile. The kit was originally priced at £2000, later rising to £6000; prices for the fully built car started at £6500 for a basic model, but eventually climbed to £13,000 with Value-added tax (VAT) and duty included.

TMC had ambitious plans for sales to Canada. Automotive News reported that by late 1985 the company had exported five cars to the country with plans to reach annual sales of fifty cars per year in that market, where the car sold for CDN$20,000.

A planned restyling of the car by Richard Oakes, designer of the Nova/Sterling kit car, did not happen.

Production of the TMC Costin ran from 1983 to 1987. Although TMC claimed to have built close to one hundred cars, the total number of cars produced is typically reported to have been either twenty-six or thirty-nine units.

In 1988 TMC sold the rights to the chassis to Daniel (Dan) Panoz, son of Don Panoz, an American businessman who owned a pharmaceutical firm based in Ireland. The younger Panoz had applied for a job at TMC. Some references say that he briefly worked for TMC, while others say that the company went out of business before he could start. With financial backing from his father, Dan Panoz acquired the plans and jigs for the chassis, as well as parts for two complete cars, which were shipped to the United States. He also hired TMC engineers Sean Thompson and Mick Murphy. Panoz established Panoz Auto Development (PAD), and used the TMC Costin's chassis design as the basis of the Panoz Roadster"

Features
Production versions of the TMC Costin use Ford engines or derivatives. The base engine was a  Ford Crossflow. A version with the Ford CVH engine was also offered. For even more power the car could be fitted with Cosworth BDA or BDR engines.

The space frame chassis was designed by Costin. It is noteworthy for being a union of three modules or cells: a front frame to which the engine and suspension are bolted, a triangular centre section for the driver and passenger, and a rear section to support the rear suspension and roll bar. The structure was particularly effective at increasing stiffness in the cockpit/passenger area.

The front windscreen is a bespoke item made by Pilkington exclusively for TMC. The car's doors are hinged on the A pillars and pivot up and forward when opened. The large triangular B-pillar and roof hoop enclose the rollbar, and the roof is a Targa top with a removable centre section. A glass rear hatch cover was standard. The bodywork is made of glass-reinforced plastic (GRP), aluminium, and Kevlar panels.

The front suspension consists of adjustable equal-length upper and lower wishbones, coil springs and telescopic dampers. The rear suspension locates a live rear axle and comprises double radius arms and a Panhard rod. The axle is an Atlas unit from a Ford Capri. Front brakes are Girling discs, while the rear brakes are drums.

Technical data

Motorsports

The TMC Costin is credited with some notable racing success. It took pole position in its debut race at Mondello Park in 1983. This prompted Peter Thompson to ask "What is 'pole'?". Driven by John Keaney, the car won on its first outing.

Val Thompson has personally raced a TMC Costin in vintage events.

References

Further reading

External links 
 

Cars introduced in 1983
Cars of Ireland
Sports cars
Kit cars
Cars discontinued in 1987